A number of processes of surface growth in areas ranging from mechanics of growing gravitational bodies through propagating fronts of phase transitions, epitaxial growth of nanostructures and 3D printing, growth of plants, and cell mobility require non-Euclidean description because of incompatibility of boundary conditions and different mechanisms of developing stresses at interfaces. Indeed, these mechanisms result in the curving of initially flat elements of the body and changing separation between different elements of it (especially in the soft matter).  Gradual accumulation of deformations under the influx of accumulating mass results in the memory-conscious grows of the body and makes strains the subject of long-range forces. As a result of all above factors, generic non-Euclidean growth is described in terms of Riemannian geometry with a space- and time-dependent curvature.

References

F. Sozio, M.F. Shojaei, S. Sadik, and A. Yavari, Nonlinear mechanics of thermoelastic accretion, \emph{Zeitschrift f\"ur Angewandte Mathematik und Physik (ZAMP)} \textbf{71}(3), 2020, 87.

F. Sozio and A. Yavari, Nonlinear mechanics of accretion, \emph{Journal of Nonlinear Science} \textbf{29}(4), 2019, 1813-1863.

F. Sozio and A. Yavari, Nonlinear mechanics of surface growth for cylindrical and spherical elastic bodies, \emph{Journal of the Mechanics and Physics of Solids} \textbf{98}, 2017, pp. 12-48.

Further reading 
A. V. Manzhirov and S. A. Lychev, Mathematical modeling of additive manufacturing technologies, in: Proceedings of the World Congress on Engineering 2014, Lecture Notes in Engineering and Computer Science (IAENG, London, UK, 2014), 2, pp. 1404–1409.

A. D. Drozdov, Viscoelastic Structures: Mechanics of Growth and Aging (Academic Press, New York, 1998).

Non-Euclidean geometry